ISO/IEC JTC 1/SC 39 Sustainability for and by Information Technology is a standardization subcommittee of the Joint Technical Committee ISO/IEC JTC 1 of the International Organization for Standardization (ISO) and the International Electrotechnical Commission (IEC), that develops and facilitates standards within the field of sustainability and resource efficiency through Information Technology. The international secretariat of ISO/IEC JTC 1/SC 39 is the American National Standards Institute (ANSI), located in the United States.

History
ISO/IEC JTC 1/SC 39 was formed in November 2011 during the 26th Plenary Meeting of ISO/IEC JTC 1 in San Diego, California, with the intent of continuing ISO/IEC JTC 1’s work in energy efficiency issues. The subcommittee was established after Resolution 27 was approved by ISO/IEC JTC 1, which outlined the new subcommittee’s terms of reference, proposed working groups (WGs), and expected liaison activity. A working group on Energy Efficient Date Centres and its terms of reference were proposed in this document, though the title of the working group was later changed to Resource Efficient Data Centres. ISO/IEC JTC 1/SC 39 held its first plenary meeting in Redwood Shores, California in June 2012. The meeting concluded with the appointment of a chairperson to the subcommittee: director of global standards, codes, and environment at Schneider Electric, Jay Taylor.

Scope and mission
The scope of ISO/IEC JTC 1/SC 39 is “Standardization related to the intersection of resource efficiency and IT which supports environmentally and economically viable development, application, operation, and management aspects.”

The mission of ISO/IEC JTC 1/SC 39 is to use standardization related to the efficient use of resources to propel and sustain the economically and environmentally viable development of Information Technology.

Structure
ISO/IEC JTC 1/SC 39 is made up of two working groups (WGs), each of which carries out specific tasks in standards development within the field of sustainability for and by Information Technology. The focus of each working group is described in the group’s terms of reference. Working groups of ISO/IEC JTC 1/SC 39 are:

ISO/IEC JTC 1/SC 39 also has the Study Group on Gap Analysis which performs gap analyses for assessment methodology for quantifying green effects of ICT functions for education, and guidelines for the adoption of green technologies by other industry sectors through IT.

Collaborations
ISO/IEC JTC 1/SC 39 works in close collaboration with a number of other organizations or subcommittees, both internal and external to ISO or IEC, in order to avoid conflicting or duplicative work. Organizations internal to ISO or IEC that collaborate with or are in liaison to ISO/IEC JTC 1/SC 39 include:
 ISO/IEC JTC 1/SC 36, Information technology for learning, education and training
 ISO/IEC JTC 1/SC 38, Distributed Application Platforms and Services (DAPS)
 ISO/IEC JPC 2, Joint Project Committee - Energy efficiency and renewable energy sources - Common terminology
 ISO/TC 171, Document management applications
 ISO/TC 207, Environmental management
 ISO/TC 242, Energy management
 ISO/TC 257, General technical rules for determination of energy savings in renovation projects, industrial enterprises and regions
 IEC TC 8, Systems aspects for electrical energy supply
 IEC TC 57/WG 21, Power systems management and associated information exchange – Interfaces and protocol profiles relevant to systems connected to the electrical grid
 IEC TC 100, Audio, video and multimedia systems and equipment
 IEC TC 108, Safety of electronic equipment within the field of audio/video, information technology and communication technology
 IEC TC 111, Environmental standardization for electrical and electronic products and systems
 IEC PC 118, Smart grid user interface
 IEC/SEG 1, Systems Evaluation Group - Smart Cities
 IEC SMB SG 3, Smart grid
 IEC SMB SG 4, LVDC distribution systems up to 1500 V DC

Organizations external to ISO or IEC that collaborate with or are in liaison to ISO/IEC JTC 1/SC 39 include:
 Ecma International
 ITU-T SG 5, Environment and climate change
 The Green Grid
 CENELEC TC 215, Electrotechnical aspects of telecommunications equipment
 European Telecommunications Standards Institute (ETSI)

Member countries
Countries pay a fee to ISO to be members of subcommittees.

The 17 "P" (participating) members of ISO/IEC JTC 1/SC 39 are: Belgium, Canada, China, Finland, France, Germany, Italy, Japan, Republic of Korea, Luxembourg, Netherlands, Norway, Russian Federation, Singapore, South Africa, United Kingdom, and United States of America.

The 10 "O" (observing) members of ISO/IEC JTC 1/SC 39 are: Argentina, Australia, Austria, Czech Republic, Islamic Republic of Iran, Ireland, Kenya, Poland, Spain, and Switzerland.

Standards and Technical Reports
ISO/IEC JTC 1/SC 39 has one published standard, ISO/IEC 19395 and is currently working on developing a number of standards within the field of sustainability for and by Information Technology. Some standards within this field currently under development by ISO/IEC JTC 1/SC 39 include:

See also
 ISO/IEC JTC 1
 List of ISO standards
 American National Standards Institute
 International Organization for Standardization
 International Electrotechnical Commission

References

External links 
 ISO/IEC JTC 1/SC 39 page at ISO

039
International sustainability organizations